Andrey Vadimovich Shlyapnikov (born 13 January 1959) is a former Soviet sprinter. He competed in the men's 100 metres at the 1980 Summer Olympics.

References

1959 births
Living people
Athletes (track and field) at the 1980 Summer Olympics
Soviet male sprinters
Olympic athletes of the Soviet Union
Universiade medalists in athletics (track and field)
People from Kostroma
Universiade silver medalists for the Soviet Union
Medalists at the 1981 Summer Universiade